Billel Benaldjia (born August 23, 1988) is an Algerian football player who plays as a midfielder for USM Bel-Abbès in the Algerian Ligue Professionnelle 1.

References

External links
 

1988 births
Living people
Footballers from Algiers
Algerian footballers
Algeria under-23 international footballers
CR Belouizdad players
USM Alger players
USM El Harrach players
DRB Tadjenanet players
USM Bel Abbès players
Algerian Ligue Professionnelle 1 players
Association football midfielders
21st-century Algerian people